Deoxyribonuclease II, lysosomal is a protein that in humans is encoded by the DNASE2 gene.

Function

This gene encodes a member of the DNase family. The protein, located in the lysosome, hydrolyzes DNA under acidic conditions and mediates the breakdown of DNA during erythropoiesis and apoptosis. 

Two codominant alleles have been characterized, DNASE2*L (low activity) and DNASE2*H (high activity), that differ at one nucleotide in the promoter region. The DNASE2*H allele is represented in this record.

References

Further reading